Conrad Jomilon Mojuntin was a Malaysian politician. He was the Sabah Minister of Culture, Youth and Sports from 1981 to 1985. He was the Member of Sabah State Legislative Assembly for Moyog from 1976 to 1985. He died on 17 November 2021 as a result of a stroke.

Election result

Controversies

Murder of Anthony Chong 
On 23 October 2005, Conrad dan 10 other people was remanded due to the murder of Anthony Chong Kim Fook, in front of Penampang Public Library. Anthony was shot by a shotgun after an argument earlier that day in a pub. Conrad had a license to own a shotgun but the person who took the shot was unknown. On 1 April 2008, Conrad was first acquitted in the Magistrate Court but on 2 January 2009, was sentenced to 6 months jail in the Kota Kinabalu High Court.

Health 
He passed away on 17 November 2021 due to stroke.

Honours 
  :
  Officer of the Order of the Defender of the Realm (KMN) (1979)
  :
  Commander of the Order of Kinabalu (PGDK) – Datuk (1981)

References 

20th-century Malaysian politicians
21st-century Malaysian politicians
Place of birth missing (living people)
Independent politicians in Malaysia
Sabah People's United Front politicians
Democratic Action Party (Malaysia) politicians
Members of the Sabah State Legislative Assembly
1949 births
2021 deaths
Commanders of the Order of Kinabalu
Officers of the Order of the Defender of the Realm